Atheta parca is a species of beetle belonging to the family Staphylinidae.

Synonyms:
 Atheta (Parameotica) parca (Mulsant & Rey, 1873)
 Atheta (Philhygra) parca (Mulsant & Rey, 1873)
 Atheta nannion (Joy, 1931)

References

Staphylinidae